Dobsonville Mall is a shopping centre in Johannesburg, South Africa. Located in Dobsonville, it was the first shopping centre to be built in Soweto and was seen as an early symbol of economic development in the area.

References

Shopping centres in Johannesburg
Buildings and structures in Soweto
Shopping malls established in 1994